James Maxwell Bardeen (May 9, 1939 – June 20, 2022) was an American physicist, well known for his work in general relativity, particularly his role in formulating the laws of black hole mechanics. He also discovered the Bardeen vacuum, an exact solution of the Einstein field equation.

Early life
Bardeen was born in Minneapolis, Minnesota, on May 9, 1939.  His father, John Bardeen, won the Nobel Prize in Physics twice for inventing the transistor and formulating the theory of superconductivity; his mother, Jane Maxwell Bardeen, worked as a zoologist and a high school teacher.  During his childhood, Bardeen resided in Washington, D.C., Summit, New Jersey, and Chicago as part of his father's employment.  He attended the University Laboratory High School in Urbana, Illinois.  He then studied physics at Harvard University, even though his father wanted him to go into biology.  After graduating in 1960, he undertook postgraduate studies at the California Institute of Technology under the direction of Richard Feynman and William Alfred Fowler.  Bardeen was awarded a Doctor of Philosophy in 1965.

Career
Bardeen first worked at Caltech and the University of California, Berkeley, in postdoctoral positions.  He became a part of the astronomy department of the University of Washington in 1967.  He subsequently joined Yale University in 1972.  That same year, he co-authored the watershed paper "The Four Laws of Black Hole Mechanics" with Stephen Hawking and Brandon Carter during a meeting held at the École de physique des Houches. Later that year, Bardeen theorized the doughnut-shape and size of a black hole’s "shadow", which was later popularized by the observations of Messier 87 by the Event Horizon Telescope.

Bardeen returned to the University of Washington in 1976, remaining there until his retirement in 2006. Together with Michael S. Turner and Paul Steinhardt, he published a paper in 1982 detailing the way submicroscopic fluctuations in the density of matter and energy in the early universe would bring about the arrangement of galaxies seen in the present day.  Bardeen was also a Distinguished Visiting Research Fellow at Perimeter Institute for Theoretical Physics. In 2012, he was elected to the U.S. National Academy of Sciences.

Personal life
Bardeen married Nancy Thomas in 1968.  They met the year before in Paris while he was attending a conference, and remained married until his death. Together, they had two children, William and David.

Bardeen's brother, William A. Bardeen, was also a physicist.  His sister, Elizabeth, was married to Thomas Greytak, a physicist at MIT.  In a 2020 interview given to Federal University of Pará in Brazil, Bardeen recalls his journey as a physicist, his father's influences on him, his experiences as a doctoral student of Richard Feynman, and working with Stephen Hawking.

Bardeen died on June 20, 2022, at a retirement home in Seattle.  He was 83, and suffered from cancer prior to his death.

See also
 Bardeen–Petterson effect
 Cosmological perturbation theory
 Post-Newtonian expansion

References

External links
 James Bardeen, Perimeter Institute homepage
 Publications of James Maxwell Bardeen in the SPIRES database
 arXiv.org preprints for J. Bardeen
 Search on author James Bardeen from Google Scholar

1939 births
2022 deaths
20th-century American physicists
21st-century American physicists
American cosmologists
American relativity theorists
California Institute of Technology alumni
Deaths from cancer in Washington (state)
Fellows of the American Association for the Advancement of Science
Harvard College alumni
Members of the United States National Academy of Sciences
People from Minneapolis
Sloan Research Fellows
University of Washington faculty
Fellows of the American Physical Society